Fr. Elias Wen, Chinese name Wen Zizheng (10 November 1896 – 9 June 2007), was the oldest clergyman of the Eastern Orthodox Church when he died at the age of 110 in San Francisco, California.

Fr. Elias was born into a poor bricklayer/tiler family in Beijing in 1896, and converted to the Orthodox Christian Faith at the age of 7.  From 1905 to 1916 he studied at the Russian Orthodox Mission school in Beijing, and then at the Seminary there from 1916 until 1925.  He was ordained a deacon in 1924, and a priest in 1925. On 24 June 1935, he became one of the founding members of the Shanghai China Orthodox Association; he served as one of three vice-chairmen of the association under chairman . In 1946 he became the rector of the Surety of Sinners Russian Orthodox Cathedral in Shanghai, and served under St. John (Maximovitch).

In 1949, he fled China to Hong Kong, as the Communists took over the mainland, and in 1957 he was transferred to the Holy Virgin Cathedral in San Francisco, where he again served under St. John.

He was elevated to the rank of protopresbyter in 1981. He remained at this cathedral for the remainder of his life. Fr. Elias is survived by five sons, one daughter, 14 grandchildren and six great-grandchildren.

See also

Oldest people

Notes

External links
 Holy Virgin Cathedral, San Francisco
 Surety of Sinners Russian Orthodox Cathedral, Shanghai

1896 births
2007 deaths
Eastern Orthodox Christians from China
Eastern Orthodoxy in Hong Kong
Eastern Orthodox priests in the United States
American supercentenarians
Chinese supercentenarians
Men supercentenarians
20th-century Eastern Orthodox priests
21st-century Eastern Orthodox priests
Chinese emigrants to the United States